Kul-chur inscription or Küli Čor inscription was an inscription erected in honor of a military leader called Kul Chur of the Xueyantuo. It was erected between 723 and 725.

Discovery and translation

Region
It is located in Ih-hoshoot district of Delgerhaan sum in Töv Province, in 200 km southwest from Ulaanbaatar, Mongolia. Location: N46º54´ - E104º33´

Complete text

Identity
Since the first line of the Küli Çor inscription is incomplete, the "apa tarqan čıqan tonyukuk atıγ bermiš" section follows the part that starts with the "üčün" preposition. It is translated as "apa tarqan gave the name čıqan tonyukuk". Thus, it is possible to argue that the name of Küli Çor before he received his hero name (er at) was Tonyukuk. Because, on the second line of the western face of the inscription, the missing beginning of the line could be read as "quda jegtürmiš Išbara Čїqan Küli Čur bolmïš" which translated into "(when … happened) (since) he was created (better), he took that title of Išvara Čıqan Küli Čor". It is understood that the hero name of the protagonist of the inscription hero was Küli Çor. Gerard Clauson states that the first three lines of the inscription provides information on the identity of Küli Çor. The author considered that the personal name of Küli Çor was Tonyukuk, however this person was not in fact the known Tonyukuk, since his known title was Boyla Baγa Tarqan and especially based on the name Qapaghan Qaghan to be mentioned in the third line, it was not possible for Küli Çor to die after 716. It was not possible to obtain the title of "Köl", witnessed as Kül Tigin in Turks, and "otčigin" by Mongolians, which was given to the smallest male child of the house. It is worth noting that the name or title unity in the first line of the Küli Çor inscription should be considered with the name Tonyukuk mentioned both in Tonyukuk and Küli Çor inscriptions, although both are not related to the famous Tonyukuk. It is not written with ñ but using the signs that correspond to n and y. Based on the mentioned views, it is possible to argue that the title unity "Toñuquq Boyla Baγa Tarqan" observed in Tonyukuk inscriptions referred to Tonyukuk, and the Chykan Tonyukuk mentioned in Küli Çor inscription was not related to Tonyukuk, and it was the childhood name of Küli Çor before he received his hero name.

References

Further reading 
 Erhan Aydın: "Name, Titles, And Identity in the Küli Čor Inscription", Archivum Eurasiae Medii Aevi, vol. 24 (2018), p. 5-18.

History of Mongolia
Archaeological sites in Mongolia
Turkic inscriptions
Göktürks
8th-century inscriptions